Igor Stanislavovich Povalyayev (born 16 November 1962) is a former Russian-Uzbekistani professional footballer.

Club career
He made his professional debut in the Soviet Top League in 1979 for FC Pakhtakor Tashkent. He played 3 games in the European Cup 1988–89 for FC Spartak Moscow.

See also
Football in Russia
List of football clubs in Russia

References

1962 births
Sportspeople from Tashkent
Living people
Soviet footballers
Uzbekistani footballers
Russian footballers
Association football defenders
Association football midfielders
Pakhtakor Tashkent FK players
FC Rostov players
FC Spartak Moscow players
FC Lokomotiv Moscow players
FC Dynamo Stavropol players
Birkirkara F.C. players
FC SKA Rostov-on-Don players
Soviet Top League players
Russian Premier League players
Maltese Premier League players
Russian expatriate footballers
Expatriate footballers in Malta